Jake Riccardi (born 7 November 1999) is an Australian rules footballer who plays for the Greater Western Sydney Giants in the Australian Football League (AFL). He was recruited by the Greater Western Sydney Giants with the 51st draft pick in the 2019 AFL draft.

Early football
Riccardi played for the Calder Cannons in the NAB League for the 2017 and 2018 seasons. Although he played 29 games and kicked 25 goals over his two seasons at the club, he was overlooked for the AFL draft, and in 2019 joined the Werribee Football Club in the Victorian Football League (VFL). During his time with Werribee, Riccardi starred, kicking a total of 38 goals. Riccardi won the Fothergill–Round–Mitchell Medal for best young talent in the VFL.

AFL career
Riccardi debuted in the Giants' 12 point loss to the West Coast Eagles in the 13th round of the 2020 AFL season. On debut, Riccardi kicked 2 goals. In his next game, Riccardi kicked 4 goals in the Giants' 38 point win over the Fremantle Dockers, earning much attention and being compared to former AFL stars such as Matthew Pavlich and Wayne Carey. He earned a 2020 AFL Rising Star nomination for his Round 14 performance.

Statistics
Statistics are correct to the 2020 season 

|- style="background:#EAEAEA"
| scope="row" text-align:center | 2020
| 
| 26 || 5 || 9 || 6 || 37 || 15 || 52 || 30 || 2 || 1.8 || 1.2 || 7.4 || 3.0 || 10.4 || 6.0 || 0.4 || 
|- style="background:#EAEAEA; font-weight:bold; width:2em"
| scope="row" text-align:center class="sortbottom" colspan=3 | Career
| 5
| 9
| 6
| 37
| 15
| 52
| 30
| 2
| 1.8
| 1.2
| 7.4
| 3.8
| 10.4
| 6.0
| 0.4
| –
|}

References

External links

1999 births
Living people
Greater Western Sydney Giants players
Australian rules footballers from Victoria (Australia)
Calder Cannons players
Werribee Football Club players